Gołębiów may refer to the following places:
Gołębiów, Grójec County in Masovian Voivodeship (east-central Poland)
Gołębiów, Lipsko County in Masovian Voivodeship (east-central Poland)
Gołębiów, Świętokrzyskie Voivodeship (south-central Poland)